The Old St. Helena Parish Jail, adjacent to the courthouse square in Greensburg in St. Helena Parish, Louisiana, was built in about 1855 and is one of the oldest structures in the parish.  It was listed on the National Register of Historic Places in 1980.

It is a two-story brick building with remains of cells, including bars in windows.  It was deemed significant "as a good example of
a mid-nineteenth century jail building". In 1980 it was thought there probably were fewer than five such examples in Louisiana.

References

Jails on the National Register of Historic Places in Louisiana
Government buildings completed in 1855
St. Helena Parish, Louisiana
Prisons in Louisiana
1855 establishments in Louisiana